Mast Mohabbat is a 2016 Indian Kannada-language romance film written by S. Venugopala and directed by Mohan Malagi making his debut. It stars Prem Kumar and Poonam Bajwa. The music is composed by Mano Murthy. The film is produced by V. Shekar under Manasa Movies banner.

Cast
 Prem Kumar as Sri
 Poonam Bajwa as Maya
 Naveen Krishna
 Chikkanna
 Raju Thalikote
 Shakeela
 Swayamvara Chandru

Production
Debutant director Mohan Malagi, an assistant to acclaimed director duo Dorai-Bhagwan, who hails from Raichur district, came up with a love script written by S. Venugopla (Techie by profession then) and roped in Prem Kumar as the lead protagonist. Initially, actress Vandana Gupta was roped in for the female lead. However, due to the date clashes, she dropped out from the film and then Poonam Bajwa replaced her for the role. The major portion of the shoot took place at Ooty and Mysore locations.

Soundtrack

Mano Murthy composed the film's background score and the soundtrack, lyrics for which was penned by K. Kalyan, Jayant Kaikini and Raghu Shastry. The soundtrack album consists of eight tracks. It was released on 27 August 2015 in Bangalore.

Track listing

References

External links
 

2016 films
Indian romance films
Films scored by Mano Murthy
Films shot in Ooty
2010s Kannada-language films
2016 directorial debut films
2016 romance films